The Rocket Post is a 2004 British drama film directed by Stephen Whittaker and starring Ulrich Thomsen, Shauna Macdonald, Kevin McKidd and Patrick Malahide. It is set on a remote Scottish island during the late 1930s. The arrival of German rocket scientist Gerhard Zucker is not initially welcomed by the inhabitants of the island.

The film was shot in 2001, but its release was delayed by several years. Additional footage was shot in 2005, and the film was given a limited release in Scotland the following year.

The story is very loosely based on experiments in 1934 by the German inventor Gerhard Zucker to provide a postal service to the island of Scarp by rocket mail. Another fictionalised account of the experiment formed the basis of a 2001 film, also called The Rocket Post, which was filmed on Taransay. The film's original score was composed by Nigel Clarke & Michael Csanyi-Wills and recorded by the Royal Philharmonic Orchestra in London.

Plot
Two German rocket scientists are unable to obtain funding for their experiments from the German Government. They travel to Scarp, an island in the Outer Hebrides of Scotland. Their experiments initially end in disastrous failure. Over time one of the scientists, Heinz Dombrowsky is fed up with the primitive living conditions and returns to Germany where rocketry has obtained the interest of the Third Reich. Things look up for the remaining scientist Gerhard Zucker when he falls in love with a local lass and a local handyman improves his rockets to successfully keep them from exploding.

Germany desires Gerhard to return to Germany, sending a U-Boat to abduct him.

Cast
Ulrich Thomsen as Gerhard Zucker
Shauna Macdonald as Catriona Mackay
Gary Lewis as Jimmy Roach
Kevin McKidd as Thomas McKinnon
Patrick Malahide as Charles Ilford
Eddie Marsan as Heinz Dombrowsky
Clive Russell as Angus MacKay
Jimmy Yuill as James MacLeod
Ian McNeice as Alex Miln
John Wood as Sir Wilson Ramsay
Niall Maclennan as James Maclennan
Alasdair Maclennan as Paul Maclennan
Tim Barlow as Hector McDougal
Iain MacRae as Islander 1
Lewis Iain MacNeill as Islander 2

References

External links
 Zucker Rocket
 
 
 Guerilla In The Midst...: Sometimes getting the money for your film can be the worst outcome.

2004 films
British drama films
Films directed by Stephen Whittaker
2000s English-language films
2000s British films